Beyond Sanctorum is the second studio album by Swedish metal band Therion, released in January 1992. It was re-released on 27 November 2000 under the Nuclear Blast label as a part of The Early Chapters of Revelation boxset. It contains remastered songs, as well as four bonus tracks.

Recording and production 
The band signed a contract with Active Records after the deal with previous label Deaf Records was signed only for one album and relations between band and label [Deaf] weren't positive. Therion began to record a second full-length album in The Montezuma Studio in 1991. Before the recordings started bass guitar player Erik Gustafsson decided to leave the band in order to return home to the U.S., but Therion continued as a trio with Peter Hansson, Oskar Forss and Christofer Johnsson filling in on bass guitar.

Music, legacy and lyrics 

According to Christofer Johnsson, Beyond Sanctorum saw the band exploring "different elements", like Persian traditional music, and the inclusion of clean singing—female as well as male—to accompany increased keyboard experimentations.

Deathmetal.org notes allusions to Celtic Frost and Obituary and a technique similar to that of Godflesh in layering of melodies, an approach that would be material to future black metal and death metal bands. With Beyond Sanctorum, Therion also added vibrant yet unsentimental solos and creative bass harmony to the metal music lexicon.

The lyrics of the album diverge into the occult and introduce a Lovecraftian influence with the track "Cthulhu".

Tour 
After recording album, Therion started to play their first live shows in central Europe, mainly in the Netherlands and Belgium, although simultaneously band ran into a few personnel problems. Forss decided to leave the band, Hansson quit the band after health problems. The shows were played using a new lineup. Piotr Wawrzeniuk, from the band Carbonized in which Johnsson also played, took up drumming duties. The guitar was taken up by Magnus Barthelsson, an old school friend of Johnsson's, while Andreas Wahl took up the bass.

Reception 
Deathmetal.org considers Beyond Sanctorum a classic of early 1990s Swedish death metal, dubbing it an "endlessly inventive" album that "stimulate[s] fantasy and thought".

Track listing

Personnel 

Therion
 Christofer Johnsson – vocals, guitar, bass
 Peter Hansson – guitar, keyboards, bass
 Oskar Forss – drums

 Guest musicians
 Magnus Eklöv – lead guitar on "Symphony of the Dead" & "Beyond Sanctorum"
 Anna Granqvist – vocals on "Symphony of the Dead" & "Paths"
 Fredriq Lundberg – vocals on "Symphony of the Dead" & "Paths"

 Production
 Rex Gisslén – engineer, co-producer
 Kristian Wåhlin – cover art

Notes

References

External links 
 Beyond Sanctorum at the official website
 
 

 Audio samples
 Beyond Sanctorum at Amazon.com

1992 albums
Active Records albums
Albums with cover art by Kristian Wåhlin
Nuclear Blast albums
Therion (band) albums